Rui Miguel Melo Rodrigues (born 15 November 1983), known as Rui Miguel, is a Portuguese former professional footballer who played as an attacking midfielder.

Club career
Born in Viseu, Rui Miguel began playing for hometown's Académico FC, first appearing as a senior in the third division. In 2004, he stayed in that level, signing with S.C. Covilhã.

Rui Miguel moved into the Primeira Liga in the following season, with Associação Naval 1º de Maio. His competition debut took place on 22 August 2005 as he came on as a second-half substitute in a 2–0 away win against Vitória de Guimarães, and the vast majority of his appearances would also be from the bench, as on 26 August in the 2–3 home loss to FC Porto where he featured 35 minutes.

Rui Miguel started 2006–07 again in division three, with S.L. Nelas. However, in January 2007, he moved to Poland and signed with Zagłębie Lubin; after one and a half years he returned to his country, where he finally would make a name for himself in the top flight, first with F.C. Paços de Ferreira.

Rui Miguel signed with Vitória Guimarães for the 2009–10 campaign. Never an undisputed started except for the league's final games (four of his five goals came during that stretch), he contributed solidly as the Guimarães-based team finished sixth and nearly qualified for the UEFA Europa League, for example scoring a last-minute equaliser against eventually fourth-placed Sporting CP (1–1, at home).

After two seasons in Minho and 51 official appearances, Rui Miguel signed for Russian club FC Krasnodar.

References

External links

1983 births
Living people
People from Viseu
Portuguese footballers
Association football midfielders
Primeira Liga players
Liga Portugal 2 players
Segunda Divisão players
Académico de Viseu F.C. players
S.C. Covilhã players
Associação Naval 1º de Maio players
F.C. Paços de Ferreira players
Vitória S.C. players
C.D. Trofense players
Ekstraklasa players
Zagłębie Lubin players
Russian Premier League players
FC Krasnodar players
Liga I players
FC Astra Giurgiu players
Cypriot First Division players
AEL Limassol players
Moldovan Super Liga players
FC Zimbru Chișinău players
Portuguese expatriate footballers
Expatriate footballers in Poland
Expatriate footballers in Russia
Expatriate footballers in Romania
Expatriate footballers in Cyprus
Expatriate footballers in Moldova
Portuguese expatriate sportspeople in Poland
Portuguese expatriate sportspeople in Russia
Portuguese expatriate sportspeople in Romania
Portuguese expatriate sportspeople in Cyprus
Portuguese expatriate sportspeople in Moldova
Sportspeople from Viseu District